Brastad is a locality situated in Lysekil Municipality, Västra Götaland County, Sweden. It had 1,846 inhabitants in 2010.

Sports
The following sports clubs are located in Brastad:

 Stångenäs AIS

References

External links 

Populated places in Västra Götaland County
Populated places in Lysekil Municipality